Chadron Senior High School is a public secondary school located in Chadron, Nebraska, United States. It is part of the Chadron Public Schools school district.

Public high schools in Nebraska
Schools in Dawes County, Nebraska